The ZF 4HP14 is a four-speed automatic transmission for passenger cars from ZF Friedrichshafen AG.  Introduced in 1984, and produced through 2001, it was used in Citroën, Peugeot, and Daewoo front-wheel drive cars.

Specifications

Technical data

Applications
1984–1993 Citroën BX 1.6
1985–1993 Citroën BX 1.9
1987–1993 Peugeot 205 1.6
1987–1993 Peugeot 205 1.9
1987–1989 Peugeot 305 1.5
1987–1996 Peugeot 309 1.6
1987–1996 Peugeot 309 1.9
1987–1997 Peugeot 405 1.6
1987–1997 Peugeot 405 1.8
1987–1997 Peugeot 405 1.9
1990–1996 Volvo 400 series
1991–1998 Rover 800 (XX/R17)
1992–1993 Citroën ZX 1.6
1992–1998 Citroën ZX 1.8
1993–1998 Citroën Xantia 1.8
1993–1998 Citroën Xantia 2.0
1993–2001 Peugeot 306 1.8
1993–2001 Peugeot 306 2.0
1996–1997 Daewoo Nubira 1.5
1996–1997 Daewoo Nubira 1.8
1996–1997 Daewoo Leganza 1.8
1996–1997 Daewoo Leganza 2.0

See also
list of ZF transmissions

References

4HP14